Maisonnette or Maisonnettes may refer to:

 Maisonnette, New Brunswick
 Pointe de Maisonnette (New Brunswick)
 Consolation-Maisonnettes

See also 
 Maisonette (disambiguation)